William DeHart Hubbard (November 25, 1903 – June 23, 1976) was a track and field athlete who was the first African American to win an Olympic gold medal in an individual event: the running long jump at the 1924 Paris Summer games.

He attended and graduated from Walnut Hills High School in Cincinnati, graduated with honors from the University of Michigan in 1927 where he was a three-time National Collegiate Athletic Association champion (1923 & 1925 outdoor long jump, 1925 100-yard dash) and seven-time Big Ten Conference champion in track and field (1923 & 1925 indoor 50-yard dash, 1923, 1924, & 1925 outdoor long jump, 1924 & 1925 outdoor 100-yard dash). His 1925 outdoor long jump of  stood as the Michigan Wolverines team record until 1980, and it still stands second.

Upon college graduation, he accepted a position as the supervisor of the Department of Colored Work for the Cincinnati Public Recreation Commission. He remained in this position until 1941. He then accepted a job as the manager of Valley Homes, a public housing project in Cincinnati. In 1942 he moved to Cleveland, Ohio where he served as a race relations adviser for the Federal Housing Authority. He retired in 1969.  He died in Cleveland in 1976.  Hubbard was posthumously inducted into the University of Michigan Hall of Honor in 1979; he was part of the second class inducted into the Hall of Honor.  He was a member of the Omega Psi Phi fraternity.
In addition to participating in track and field events, Hubbard also was an avid bowler. He served as the president of the National Bowling Association during the 1950s. He also founded the Cincinnati Tigers, a professional baseball team, which played in the Negro American League. In 1957, Hubbard was elected to the National Track Hall of Fame.  In 2010, the Brothers of Omega Psi Phi, Incorporated, PHI Chapter established a scholarship fund honoring William DeHart Hubbard; the fund is endowed through the University of Michigan and donations can be forwarded to the University of Michigan, The William DeHart Hubbard Scholarship Fund.

See also
 List of African American firsts
 University of Michigan Athletic Hall of Honor

Notes

References
 William DeHart Hubbard at the Cincinnati Historical Society Library.
 1924 passport photo of William DeHart Hubbard
 
 

1903 births
1976 deaths
American male long jumpers
African-American male track and field athletes
Athletes (track and field) at the 1924 Summer Olympics
Athletes (track and field) at the 1928 Summer Olympics
Michigan Wolverines men's track and field athletes
Negro league baseball executives
Olympic gold medalists for the United States in track and field
Track and field athletes from Cincinnati
Medalists at the 1924 Summer Olympics
20th-century African-American sportspeople